Marcus Tullius Hun (May 22, 1845 – February 28, 1920) was a New York lawyer who served as the state's Supreme Court Reporter for 32 years, from his appointment in 1874 up to his retirement, in the fall of 1905.

Early life and education
Born in Albany, New York to Dr. Thomas Hun, he studied at private schools in Massachusetts and at the Albany Boys Academy before entering Union College, from which he graduated in 1865. He attended Albany Law School, and upon graduation was admitted to the bar and commenced the practice of law at Albany as a partner of Orlando Meads.

Legal career
In 1874 Hun was appointed Supreme Court Reporter, which position he held for 32 years, until the fall of 1905. In 1894, the Appellate Division of Supreme Court was established pursuant to a revised state constitution, and Hun thereafter served as publisher of the Appellate Division Reports. Hun has been described as "the most prolific reporter of the nominative reports". Upon his retirement, a resolution was published in 108 App Div xlv stating:

While serving in this capacity, he entered into partnership with his brother, Leonard G. Hun, under the firm name of M. T. & L. G. Hun. After the death of his brother he was associated with Russell Johnston and Learned Hand until 1902, when Hand moved to New York City. Hun then formed a new firm with his son-in-law, Lewis R. Parker, under the name Hun & Parker. On June 13, 1905, the board of trustees of Union College conferred upon him the honorary degree of LL. D.

Hun also served at various times as a director of the Albany Trust Company, and of the New York State National Bank, from which he resigned to be elected president of the Albany Savings Bank on November 16, 1909. Hun was also trustee of the Albany Law School, a member of the chapter of All Saints' Cathedral and a charter member of the Fort Orange Club.

Personal life
On December 21, 1875, he married Mary Keith Van Der Poel, with whom he had four children. Van Der Poel was a daughter of the late Isaac Van Der Poel, at one time Adjutant-General of the State.

Hun died February 28, 1920. His cause of death was listed as Acute Pulmonary Oedema. He was buried in the Albany Rural Cemetery, for which he was serving as President of the Albany Cemetery Association.

References

External links
Friends of Albany History: Cuyler Reynolds and the Albany Rural Cemetery – He Got No Respect

1845 births
1920 deaths
Union College (New York) alumni
Albany Law School alumni
Lawyers from Albany, New York
19th-century American lawyers